Anatoly Nikolayevich Yevtushenko (born 1 September 1934, Horlivka) - Honored Coach of the USSR (handball).

As a player was champion of the USSR, and then double - silver medal.

As a coach NC MAI 6 times (1968, 1970, 1971, 1972, 1974, 1975) led the club to the championship, 7 times (1969, 1973, 1976, 1977, 1978, 1979, 1980) led the club to the silver, and once (1987) - a bronze.

In 1968, the student team of the USSR under the direction of Yevtushenko became world champion. In 1969-1990 he headed Soviet Union national handball team which became the Olympic champion Montreal 1976 and Seoul 1988, the silver medalist Moscow Olympics of 1980. The national team of the Soviet Union was World Cup 1982 and silver medalist 1978 World Men's Handball Championship and World Cup 1990.

After the collapse of the Soviet Union worked in TSV Milbertshofen in Germany. Working in Kuwait, he led the team to victory at the Asian Championship and receive vouchers for the Olympics-1996. In Austria, he worked with Hypo Niederösterreich and women's national team.

In 1976, he received the title of Honored Coach of the USSR. At the same time he was awarded the gold medal of the sports committee of the Union "Best Coach in the Country".

External links
А.Н. Евтушенко в Олимпийской энциклопедии

1934 births
Living people
People from Horlivka
Merited Coaches of the Soviet Union
Recipients of the Order of Friendship of Peoples
Recipients of the Order of the Red Banner of Labour
Russian handball coaches
Soviet handball coaches
Soviet male handball players
Ukrainian male handball players
Sportspeople from Donetsk Oblast